Honey is the twelfth studio album by British singer Robert Palmer. It was released in September 1994 and reached number 25 in the UK Albums Chart. The album featured the minor hits "Girl U Want", "Know by Now" and "You Blow Me Away".

Track listing

Critical reception

Upon release, pan-European magazine Music & Media noted: "Right when you've written off the eternal nobleman as a lost crooner, he returns with a vengeance. Surrounded by ambitious musicians, Palmer has provided his most inspired album in years." People described the album as a "stunning follow-up to 1992's Ridin' High" and commented: "Through it all, Honey goes down smoothly—and Palmer proves once again that he's simply irresistible." Cash Box commented: "Robert Palmer has been making music for over two decades. His new album reflects his experience like a well-aged bottle of wine, graceful and dignified. The most impressive aspect of the record is the versatility he displays."

David Hiltbrand of Entertainment Weekly stated: "The British singer mostly plays to his strong suits: suave, double-breasted vocals, unconventional but funky rhythms, and exotic Afro-Carib musical flourishes. It all fuses on "Know by Now," the sort of bittersweet up-tempo ballad at which Palmer excels. Later on he indulges in some empty hard-rock posturing abetted by Extreme's Nuno Bettencourt. But at least Palmer steers clear of the stuffy piano-lounge standards that have marred so many of his recent releases."

In a retrospective review, Leslie Mathew of AllMusic said: "...Palmer himself sounds as inhumanly suave as ever, though much of the material is a prescription for déjà vu. Ironically, given its title, this album is much more hard-edged than Heavy Nova and Riptide. Highlights include "Know By Now," a tasty mid-paced rocker, and "Nobody But You," a twitchy, coiled funk ditty. Honey has its moments, and plenty to spare, but it also occasionally gives the impression of a man who's trying too hard."

Paul Sinclair of Super Deluxe Edition said: "Honey returns to contemporary rock/pop with a typically varied selection of songs. It doesn't really match the standards of the previous records. Singles "Know By Now" and especially "You Blow Me Away" are both strong but feel slightly let down by the production, which for the time comes across as a little cheesy and bombastic in places. Overall, rather inessential." Get Ready to Rock! wrote: "Honey saw him back exploring an eclectic mix of World music, funk, jazz, rock/pop and dance. But once again the constant switching of styles is somewhat unsettling."

Chart performance

Personnel 
 Robert Palmer – vocals, arrangements
 Alan Mansfield – keyboards, soprano saxophone 
 Nuno Bettencourt – guitars
 Gary Butcher – guitars
 Saverio Porciello – guitars
 Frank Blair – bass
 Andy Duncan – drums, percussion
 Mauro Spina – drums, percussion
 Dony Wynn – drums
 Jose Rossy – percussion
 Demo Morselli – trumpet, flugelhorn
 Sharon O'Neill – additional vocals

Production 
 Robert Palmer – producer
 Stephen Hague – producer, remix (tracks 4, 6, 8)
 Teo Macero – additional production 
 David Harper – executive producer
 Richard Coble – production coordinator
 Pino "Pinaxa" Pischetola – recording, mixing
 Chris Lord-Alge – remix (track 3)
 Mike "Spike" Drake – remix (tracks 4, 6, 8)
 Antonio Baglio – mastering

Additional Credits 
 Bill Smith Studio – design, artwork
 Robert Palmer – design concept, handwriting
 Nigel Perry – photography
 Alan Hydes – original oil painting

Studios
 Recorded and Mixed at Logic Studios (Milan, Italy).
 Mastered at Profile Studio (Milan, Italy).

References

1994 albums
Robert Palmer (singer) albums
Albums produced by Teo Macero
Albums produced by Robert Palmer (singer)
Albums produced by Stephen Hague
EMI Records albums